An incomplete list of events in Italy in 1241:

 Battle of Meloria (1241)

The first Battle of Meloria took place on 3 May 1241 near Meloria islet, off Livorno, Italy. It was fought between the fleet of the emperor Frederick II, called Stupor Mundi, in alliance with Pisa, against a Genoese squadron bringing a number of English, French and Spanish prelates to attend the council summoned to meet at the Lateran by Pope Gregory IX. Three Genoese galleys were sunk and twenty-two taken. Several of the prelates perished, and many were carried prisoners to the camp of the emperor.

References

Italy
Italy
Years of the 13th century in Italy